"Psikopatja Jote" is a song performed by Kosovo-Albanian musicians Fifi and MC Kresha. The record was released as a single through Acromax Media GmbH and was composed for the duo's participation at Kënga Magjike 2018.

Fifi and MC Kresha performed the song for the first time at the 20th edition of Kënga Magjike on 25 November 2018. The song finished third in the grand final of Kënga Magjike 2018 with 834 points.

See also 
 Kënga Magjike 2018

References 

2018 singles
2018 songs
Kënga Magjike songs
Albanian-language songs
Songs written by Fifi (singer)